Cedar Glen Lakes is an unincorporated community and census-designated place (CDP) located within Manchester Township, in Ocean County, New Jersey, United States. As of the 2010 United States Census, the CDP's population was 1,421.

Geography
According to the United States Census Bureau, the CDP had a total area of 0.699 square miles (1.810 km2), including 0.693 square miles (1.795 km2) of land and 0.006 square miles (0.015 km2) of water (0.83%).

Demographics

Census 2010

Census 2000
As of the 2000 United States Census there were 1,617 people, 1,126 households, and 451 families living in the CDP. The population density was 931.8/km2 (2,413.5/mi2). There were 1,242 housing units at an average density of 715.7/km2 (1,853.8/mi2). The racial makeup of the CDP was 98.52% White, 0.68% African American, 0.06% Native American, 0.43% Asian, 0.19% from other races, and 0.12% from two or more races. Hispanic or Latino of any race were 1.30% of the population.

There were 1,126 households, of which 0.2% had children under the age of 18 living with them, 36.2% were married couples living together, 3.6% had a female householder with no husband present, and 59.9% were non-families. 58.5% of all households were made up of individuals, and 53.3% had someone living alone who was 65 years of age or older. The average household size was 1.44 and the average family size was 2.05.

In the CDP the population was spread out, with 0.2% under the age of 18, 0.1% from 18 to 24, 2.0% from 25 to 44, 15.8% from 45 to 64, and 82.0% who were 65 years of age or older. The median age was 75 years. For every 100 females, there were 58.7 males. For every 100 females age 18 and over, there were 58.7 males.

The median income for a household in the CDP was $20,378, and the median income for a family was $30,278. Males had a median income of $40,368 versus $35,833 for females. The per capita income for the CDP was $20,246. About 1.9% of families and 3.7% of the population were below the poverty line, including none of those under age 18 and 3.1% of those age 65 or over.

References

Census-designated places in Ocean County, New Jersey
Manchester Township, New Jersey
Populated places in the Pine Barrens (New Jersey)